Nenad Vučković (born 20 December 1976) is a Croatian retired footballer.

Vučković played 12 games in the 2004–05 Slovenian PrvaLiga for NK Drava Ptuj, scoring three goals.

References

External links
 
 Nenad Vučković at immerunioner.de 

1976 births
Living people
People from Sinj
Association football forwards
Croatian footballers
HNK Hajduk Split players
NK Varaždin players
NK Drava Ptuj players
Tennis Borussia Berlin players
1. FC Union Berlin players
NK Junak Sinj players
Croatian Football League players
Slovenian PrvaLiga players
NOFV-Oberliga players
Regionalliga players
Croatian expatriate footballers
Expatriate footballers in Slovenia
Croatian expatriate sportspeople in Slovenia
Expatriate footballers in Germany
Croatian expatriate sportspeople in Germany